was a feudal domain under the Tokugawa shogunate of Edo period Japan, located in Hitachi Province (modern-day Ibaraki Prefecture), Japan. It was centered on Kasama Castle in what is now the city of Kasama, Ibaraki.  It was ruled by a number of clans during its early history, before settling under the rule of a junior branch of the Makino clan from the middle of the Edo period onward.

History
Kasama Castle was originally the stronghold of the Kasama clan, who ruled the region since the Kamakura period. However, the Kasama were destroyed by Toyotomi Hideyoshi for supporting the Odawara Hōjō, and their lands were given to the Utsunomiya clan, and subsequently to Gamo Hideyuki in 1598. Following the Battle of Sekigahara, Matsudaira Yasushige was promoted to 30,000 koku from his previous holding of Kisai Domain and was given the newly created Kasama Doman in 1601. However, he was transferred on to Shinoyama Domain in Tamba Province a few years later in 1608. He was replaced at Kasama by Ogasawara Yoshitsugu, who was then relieved of the domain less than a year later due to financial improprieties. 

Kasama was revived in 1612 for Matsudaira Yasunaga, the former castellan of Fushimi Castle. He held the domain until his promotion to Takasaki Domain in 1616 for services rendered during the Siege of Osaka. He was replaced by Nagai Naokatsu, one of Tokugawa Ieyasu’s oldest retainers, until 1622.

Kasama then came under the control of Asano Nagashige, followed by his son, Asano Nagano, until the transfer of the Asano clan to Ako Domain in 1645. The Asano were followed by a junior branch of the Inoue clan from 1645 to 1692, followed by the Honjō Matsudaira clan from 1692 to 1702. The Inoue returned to Kasama in 1702, ruling for three generations until 1747.
In 1757, Makino Sadamichi, the Kyoto shoshidai and daimyō of Nabeoka Domain in Hyuga Province was transferred to Kasama, which his descendants then held until the Meiji restoration. Under the Makino, the domain became noted for Makino ware, a type of ceramics, as well as for its numerous schools of Japanese swordsmanship, especially that of Jigen-ryū and Yuishin-Ittoryu. The domain also made efforts towards the opening of new rice lands and development of fertilizers to raise yields, as the expenses of the Makino lords was very great due to the numerous offices they held within the shogunal administration. The domain sided with the Imperial forces during the Boshin War and participated in the Battle of Aizu.

The domain had a 360 samurai households resident at Kasama Castle per a census in the Bunsei era as opposed to 348 households of townspeople.

Holdings at the end of the Edo period
As with most domains in the han system, Kasama Domain consisted of several discontinuous territories calculated to provide the assigned kokudaka, based on periodic cadastral surveys and projected agricultural yields. 

Hitachi Province
84 villages in Ibaraki District
2 villages in Shida District
Mutsu Province (Iwashiro Province)
5 villages in Ishikawa District
Mutsu Province (Iwashiro Province)
14 villages in Tamura District
12 villages in Iwaseki District
30 villages in Iwaki District

List of daimyō

References

External links
  Kasama  on "Edo 300 HTML"

Notes

Domains of Japan
1871 disestablishments in Japan
States and territories disestablished in 1871
Hitachi Province
History of Ibaraki Prefecture
Asano clan
Makino clan
Matsudaira clan
Matsui-Matsudaira clan
Ogasawara clan
Toda-Matsudaira clan